Dark Eden is also a fortress in the Legacy of Kain series of video games
Dark Eden is also a novel by Chris Beckett.

Dark Eden is an out-of-print collectible card game designed by Bryan Winter and published by Target Games that is set in the post-apocalyptic universe of the Mutant Chronicles role-playing game, among the tribes on the ravaged planet Earth. Two expansion sets named Genesis (120 cards) and Exodus were planned but never released. Dark Eden was first released in April 1997.

The original set was sold in 60-card starter decks and 15-card booster packs.

Reviews
Arcane #20
Backstab (Issue 3 - May/Jun 1997)
Magia i Miecz (Issue 40 - Apr 1997) (Polish)

References

External links
 Polish Dark Eden site

Card games introduced in 1997
Collectible card games